Doctor Doctor may refer to:

Film and television 
Doctor Doctor (film), an Indian film
Doctor Doctor (American TV series), a 1989 American television sitcom
Doctor Doctor (South Korean TV series), a 2000 South Korean television sitcom
Doctor Doctor (Australian TV series), a 2016 Australian television series
Doctor, Doctor (talk show), a 2005 live British talk show about health and illness
Doctor Doctor (character), a character in The Secret Show universe
"Doctor, Doctor", an episode of Yes, Dear
Dr. Doctor, a recurring character in South Park media

Music
"Doctor, Doctor", a song from the 1968 album Magic Bus: The Who on Tour by The Who
"Doctor Doctor" (UFO song), a song from the 1974 album Phenomenon by UFO
"Bad Case of Loving You (Doctor, Doctor)", a 1978 song by Robert Palmer
"Doctor! Doctor!", a song from the 1984 album Into the Gap by Thompson Twins
"Doctor, Doctor", a song from the 2003 EP Driving for the Storm / Doctor, Doctor by Gyroscope
"Doctor Doctor" (Just Jack song), a 2009 song
"Doctor, Doctor" an exclusive song off of the album Sometime Last Night by R5
"Doctor, Doctor" is a song from Iron Maiden

Other
Doctor! Doctor! An Insider's Guide to the Games Doctors Play, a 1986 book by Michael O'Donnell
Double doctorates , indicated in the title by "Dr. Dr." within the European Union, most notably Germany
Dr. Doctor Willard Bliss, a 19th-century American physician and Civil War veteran

See also
Doctor (disambiguation)